Query by humming (QbH) is a music retrieval system that branches off the original classification systems of title, artist, composer, and genre. It normally applies to songs or other music with a distinct single theme or melody. The system involves taking a user-hummed melody (input query) and comparing it to an existing database.  The system then returns a ranked list of music closest to the input query. 

One example of this would be a system involving a portable media player with a built-in microphone that allows for faster searching through media files.

The MPEG-7 standard includes provisions for QbH music searches.

Examples of QbH systems include ACRCloud, SoundHound, Musipedia, and Tunebot.

External links

Online demos
 ACRCloud SDKs
 SoundHound (mobile app) 
 QbH system from Musipedia
 QbH research project at NYU
 Query by Humming at Sloud Inc, QbH applet (Active X) 
 MaART at Sourceforge
 Tunebot at Northwestern University

General info and articles
 
 Query By Humming – Musical Information Retrieval in an Audio Database, paper by Asif Ghias, Jonathan Logan, David Chamberlin, Brian C. Smith; ACM Multimedia 1995
 A survey presentation of QBH by Eugene Weinstein, 2006
 The New Zealand Digital Library MELody inDEX, article by Rodger J. McNab, Lloyd A. Smith, David Bainbridge and Ian H. Witten; D-Lib Magazine 1997
 Name that Tune: A Pilot Study in Finding a Melody from a Sung Query, article by Bryan Pardo, Jonah Shifrin, and William Birmingham, Journal of the American Society for Information Science and Technology, vol. 55 (4), pp. 283-300, 2004

Acoustic fingerprinting
Music search engines
Voice technology